A Man from Wyoming is a 1930 American Pre-Code war romance film directed by Rowland V. Lee and starring Gary Cooper, June Collyer, and Regis Toomey. Written by Albert S. Le Vino and John V.A. Weaver, the film is about a man from Wyoming who enlists in the Army and is sent to the front during World War I. There he saves the life of an  American society girl working in the Ambulance Corps. Afterwards at a rest camp, they meet again, fall in love, and are secretly married.

Plot
After the United States enters World War I in 1917, Wyoming native Jim Baker (Gary Cooper) and his fellow engineer Jersey (Regis Toomey) join the Army and are sent to France with the Engineer Corps. On the battlefield, Baker rescues Patricia Hunter (June Collyer), an American society girl who wanders onto the battlefield. Having worked for the Ambulance Corps, Hunter went AWOL to escape the boredom of her job. After rescuing her from enemy fire, Baker reprimands her for her actions. Later at a rest camp, Baker and Hunter see much of each other, fall in love, and are secretly married. Sometime later, Jim is sent back to the front. When Hunter reads about Baker's death, she opens a family chateau to entertain servicemen and try to forget the man she loves. When Jim arrives at the chateau, having only been wounded, he sees her apparent gaiety and misunderstands her feelings. When he encourages her to return with him to Wyoming, she refuses, and he decides to return to the front. On Armistice Day, Baker finds her waiting for him in the town where they were married.

Cast
 Gary Cooper as Jim Baker
 June Collyer as Patricia Hunter
 Regis Toomey as Jersey
 Morgan Farley as Lt. Lee 
 E.H. Calvert as Maj. Gen. Hunter
 Mary Foy as Inspector
 Emile Chautard as French mayor
 Edgar Dearing as Sergeant
 William B. Davidson as Major
 Ben Hall as Orderly
 J. Parker McConnell as Captain in dugout

Production
A Man from Wyoming was filmed on location at Paramount Ranch in Agoura, California.

References

External links
 
 

1930 films
American black-and-white films
1930 romantic drama films
Paramount Pictures films
American romantic drama films
Films directed by Rowland V. Lee
1930s war drama films
American war drama films
American World War I films
1930s English-language films
1930s American films